Willard Bruguier III ( born 4 December 1981) is a former American professional darts player from South Dakota who currently playing in the Professional Darts Corporation events.

Career
A police officer by profession, Bruguier entered the 2017 US Darts Masters qualifiers and won the 2nd qualifier to claim a place in the North American Championship. After defeating DJ Sayre in the quarter-final and Dawson Murschell in the semi-finals, he defeated the veteran Dave Richardson in a last leg decider to book his place in the 2018 PDC World Darts Championship, where he lost to Cody Harris of New Zealand in the preliminary round.

World Championship results

PDC
 2018: Preliminary round (lost to Cody Harris 1–2)

Performance timeline
PDC

References

External links

1981 births
Professional Darts Corporation associate players
American darts players
Living people
People from Wagner, South Dakota
Native American sportspeople
Dakota people
Native American tribal police